Middle distance may refer to:

Middle-distance running, the act of running over a distance of between 800 and 3000 metres
Middle-distance swimming, the act of swimming over a distance between 200 and 800 metres
Middle-distance triathlon, a triathlon longer than sprint, but shorter than ironman distances (e.g. Olympic triathlon distance)
Middle-distance horse racing, horse flat races over a distance between 9.5 and 12.99 furlongs (or 1900 to 2599 metres)
Middle-distance orienteering, orienteering races with finish times in the region of half an hour
Middle-distance iron, a golfing term for mid-range iron golf clubs
The area between the foreground and background in an image or landscape painting

See also
Mid-range
Long distance (disambiguation)